Dicrastylis exsuccosa is a species of plant within the genus, Dicrastylis, in the family Lamiaceae.  It is endemic to inland Australia and found in Western Australia, the Northern Territory and South Australia.

Description
Dicrastylis exsuccosa is a shrub 0.3 to 1.5 m high which grows on sand-dunes and plains. It flowers from April to November.
The opposite leaves are 1 to 10 cm long and about 1 to 2 cm wide, covered with dendritic hairs, and having smooth edges The stem cross-section is roughly circular. The flower has five stamens and a five-lobed calyx, with a corolla which is white or cream.

In Western Australia it is found in the IBRA regions of Little Sandy Desert, Gascoyne, Central Ranges, Gibson Desert, Great Sandy Desert, Tanami, Great Victoria Desert or Murchison.

Taxonomy
It was first described by Mueller in 1858 as Pityrodia exsuccosa, and in 1917, was placed in the genus, Dicrastylis, by Druce.

References

exsuccosa
Flora of Western Australia
Flora of the Northern Territory
Flora of South Australia
Taxa named by Ferdinand von Mueller